Kim Kristine Martin Hasson (born 28 February 1986) is a retired Swedish goaltender, currently working in the Linköping HC organization. With the Swedish national team she won two Olympic medals, bronze in 2002 and silver in 2006, and two IIHF World Women's Championships bronze medals, in 2005 and 2007. Martin Hasson played in the SDHL with AIK and Linköping HC, in the Russian Women's Hockey League with Tornado Dmitrov, in the NCAA Division I with the Minnesota-Duluth Bulldogs, in the J20 SuperElit with the Malmö Redhawks’ junior men's team, and in the J18 Allsvenskan with Hammarby IF's junior men’s team. 

She was scheduled to make her debut with the Malmö Redhawks of the HockeyAllsvenskan, the second-tier men’s league in Sweden, on 8 March 2006, as the first woman to ever play for a professional men’s team in Sweden but this move was vetoed by the University of Minnesota Duluth, the U.S. school that had offered her a scholarship to play hockey. This was because the NCAA, the main governing body for U.S. college sports, prohibits athletes at its member schools from having previously played in a professional league, even if they are not paid.

Playing career

Minor ice hockey
Martin's first season of organized ice hockey was at the age of 10, and she did not allow a goal during the entire 17-game schedule. Martin made her international debut in November 2000 at the Four Nations Cup. She appeared in one game, a 2–2 tie against Finland.

In club competition, she is a two-time European women's champion with AIK, in 2004–05 and 2005–06. She was also acclaimed as the top goaltender in the tournament in 2005–06.

University of Minnesota-Duluth
On 22 March 2008, Martin and the UMD Bulldogs beat the Wisconsin Badgers 4–0 at the Duluth Entertainment Convention Center arena in Duluth, MN for their fourth NCAA Division I national championship. It was just the second shutout in NCAA women's hockey championship history. Martin made 28 saves in the game and 69 total saves in the Frozen Four championship tournament and was named the tournament's Most Outstanding Player. She was also named to the All-Tournament Team along with four of her teammates.

On 19 February 2011, Martin led the Bulldogs to a 9–0 shutout of the St. Cloud State Huskies at Amsoil Arena in Duluth. The win gave Martin 66 wins, a new record for Bulldogs goaltenders. The previous record was held by Martin's former teammate, Riita Schaublin.

On 3 March 2011, Martin was named the WCHA Goaltender of the Year and was named to the league's All-WCHA Second Team.

In 2011–12, Martin played with Team Sweden teammates Elin Holmlov and Danijela Rundqvist for Tornado Moscow of the Russian Women's Hockey League.

International play
Martin made her international debut for Sweden at the 2001 Women's World Championship, when she was 15 years old.  She played in two games, as Sweden finished fifth.  She also played for Sweden at the 2002 Winter Olympics, helping them to a third-place finish as a surprise starter for the bronze medal game against Finland.  Martin was selected as the starter for the medal game by a coin toss.  Martin also suited up for Sweden at the Women's World Championships in 2004, 2005, 2007, and 2008, capturing bronze medals in 2007 and 2009.

Martin made her second appearance at the 2006 Winter Olympics.  She was in goal for Sweden when they upset the United States in the semi-final.  Martin recorded 37 saves in a shootout victory, marking the first time the women's gold medal final at the Olympics would not feature a Canada – United States matchup.  At the conclusion of the tournament, Martin was named the Best Goalie by the International Ice Hockey Federation Directorate and earned a spot on the Tournament All-Star Team.

Awards and honors
Kim Martin, 2008 All-WCHA First Team
2011 WCHA Goaltending champion

References

External links
UMD Women's Hockey profile

1986 births
Living people
Ice hockey players at the 2002 Winter Olympics
Ice hockey players at the 2006 Winter Olympics
Ice hockey players at the 2010 Winter Olympics
Ice hockey players at the 2014 Winter Olympics
Medalists at the 2002 Winter Olympics
Medalists at the 2006 Winter Olympics
Minnesota Duluth Bulldogs women's ice hockey players
Olympic bronze medalists for Sweden
Olympic ice hockey players of Sweden
Olympic medalists in ice hockey
Olympic silver medalists for Sweden
Ice hockey people from Stockholm
Swedish people of British descent
Swedish women's ice hockey goaltenders
Linköping HC Dam players
AIK Hockey Dam players
HC Tornado players